Svenska Kvinnoförbundet (English: Women's Organisation of the Swedish People's Party in Finland) is the women's wing of the Swedish People's Party of Finland. The federation was founded in 1907. The federation consists of 28 local organisations throughout the Swedish-speaking areas of Finland, traditionally known as Svenskfinland. 

The federation defines itself as liberal feminist.

In June 2020, the organisation launched its own podcast about the everyday lives of women and girls.

References

External links 
 Official website

Women's wings of political parties
Swedish-speaking population of Finland
Organizations established in 1907